Keith Morgan (born 19 February 1940) is an English former footballer, who played in the Football League for Swindon Town.

References

External links
 Keith Morgan stats at Neil Brown stat site

English footballers
English Football League players
1940 births
Living people
Swindon Town F.C. players
Westbury United F.C. players
Trowbridge Town F.C. players
Association football wing halves